Roberta is an unincorporated community located in Bryan County, Oklahoma, United States. It had a post office from March 23, 1894 until February 15, 1930. Roberta was named after its first postmaster, James Roberts (1847-1946).

Notes

References
  

Unincorporated communities in Bryan County, Oklahoma
Unincorporated communities in Oklahoma